Akbar Shah (born 29 May 1996 in Singapore) is a Singaporean footballer.

References

Association football midfielders
Association football forwards
Living people
1996 births
Singaporean footballers
Balestier Khalsa FC players